Rod Laver and Darlene Hard were the defending champions, but did not compete.

Fred Stolle and Lesley Turner defeated Bob Howe and Edda Buding in the final, 11–9, 6–2 to win the mixed doubles tennis title at the 1961 Wimbledon Championships.

Seeds

  Fred Stolle /  Lesley Turner (champions)
  Enrique Morea /  Margaret Smith (semifinals)
  Jiří Javorský /  Věra Suková (semifinals)
  Bob Howe /  Edda Buding (final)

Draw

Finals

Top half

Section 1

Section 2

Section 3

Section 4

Bottom half

Section 5

Section 6

Section 7

Section 8

References

External links

X=Mixed Doubles
Wimbledon Championship by year – Mixed doubles